General elections were held in San Marino on 20 November 2016 and 4 December 2016. The San Marino First alliance received a plurality of the popular vote, but fell short of a majority in the Grand and General Council, initially being allocated 25 seats. As no single bloc had won a majority of seats, a runoff was held on 4 December 2016 between the top two coalitions, San Marino First and Adesso.sm, to determine the winner of the majority prize. The second round saw Adesso.sm win with 58% of the vote, resulting in seats being reallocated and the winning alliance receiving 35 seats.

Electoral system

The 60 members of the Grand and General Council were elected by proportional representation, with seats allocated using the d'Hondt method. The electoral threshold is calculated by multiplying the number of parties running in the elections by 0.4, with a maximum possible threshold of 3.5%.

If no single bloc obtained an absolute majority, a runoff election would be held between the two most popular coalitions, of which the winner will obtain a majority prize – a seat bonus ensuring a majority.

Results

Elected members

References

General elections in San Marino
San Marino
General election
San Marino